The Piano Trio No. 4 in E minor, Op. 90, B. 166, (also called Dumky trio from the subtitle Dumky) is a composition by Antonín Dvořák for piano, violin and cello. It is among the composer's best-known works.

It is also a well-known example of chamber music that significantly deviates from the traditional structure of classical chamber music, both in terms of the quantity of movements and the formal organization of those movements.

Title
Dumky, the plural form of dumka, is a term introduced into Slavic languages from the Ukrainian. Originally, it is the diminutive form of the term Duma, plural dumy, which refers to epic ballads, specifically a song or lament of captive people. During the nineteenth century, composers from other Slavic countries began using the duma as a classical form used to indicate a brooding, introspective composition with cheerful sections interspersed within. Dvořák used the dumka form in several other compositions, including his Dumka for Solo Piano, Op. 35; Slavonic Dance No. 2; String Sextet; and his Piano Quintet, Op. 81

History
Dvořák completed the trio on 12 February 1891. It premiered in Prague on 11 April 1891, with violinist Ferdinand Lachner, cellist Hanuš Wihan, and Dvořák himself on piano. The same evening, Prague's Charles University awarded the composer an honorary doctorate.
The work was so well received that Dvořák performed it on his forty-concert farewell tour throughout Moravia and Bohemia, just before he left for the United States to head the National Conservatory of Music of America in New York City. The trio was published while Dvořák was in America and was proofread by his friend Johannes Brahms.

Structure

The piece is in six sections:

The composition features six dumky episodes throughout. The initial three dumky are connected together without interruption in the harmonically complementary keys given above, in effect forming a long first movement. The final three dumky are presented in unrelated keys, thus giving the overall impression of a four-movement structure.

Music critic Daniel Felsenfeld describes the form as follows:
The form of the piece is structurally simple but emotionally complicated, being an uninhibited Bohemian lament. Considered essentially formless, at least by classical standards, it is more like a six movement dark fantasia—completely original and successful, a benchmark piece for the composer. Being completely free of the rigors of sonata form gave Dvořák license to take the movements to some dizzying, heavy, places, able to be both brooding and yet somehow, through it all, a little lighthearted.

Musicologists Derek Katz and Michael Beckerman observe, "Whereas in the quintet [Op. 81] he had borrowed a plan from Schumann to mold his dumka into a quasi-traditional framework, here he allows each of the six dumky to stand fully realized on its own."

Discography
 Dumka No. 5, with Itzhak Perlman, Yo-Yo Ma and Rudolf Firkušný, Sony CD (1994) and Kultur DVD (2007)

References

External links
 
 , performed by the Beaux Arts Trio

Piano trios by Antonín Dvořák
1891 compositions
Compositions in E minor